Ivy Hill Cemetery is a cemetery in the Rosemont Historic District of Alexandria, Virginia, United States. Burials began at the site in 1811, when it was a family cemetery, and it received a charter as a community cemetery in 1856. The adjoining residential neighborhood was developed beginning in 1908 as a streetcar suburb of Washington, D.C., as trolley lines of the Washington, Alexandria and Mount Vernon railway extended from Alexandria's nearby Union Station (opened 1905). The cemetery is now also known for its rare and protected flora and fauna.

Notable burials
Judge Albert Vickers Bryan
Congressman Charles Creighton Carlin
Catharine Carter Critcher, painter, daughter of John Critcher
Congressman John Critcher
Bryan Fairfax, 8th Lord Fairfax of Cameron
Charles M. Goodman, acclaimed modernist architect 
Fairfax Harrison, railroad magnate
Vola Lawson, first female city manager of Alexandria 
Congressman Richard Bland Lee
Benjamin Franklin Stringfellow, infamous Confederate spy
Nicholas Trist
Wernher von Braun, Nazi, aerospace engineer and space flight pioneer
Harry H. Vaughan, military aide to President Harry S. Truman
Amelita Ward
Descendants of the Washington family

References

External links

 

Cemeteries in Alexandria, Virginia
1811 establishments in Virginia
Historic district contributing properties in Virginia